The 1973 Cleveland Browns season was the team's 24th season with the National Football League. After a solid 1972 season, which included a playoff appearance, the Browns got off to a solid start, winning three of their first four games on the way to a 7-3-1 start. However, the Browns did not win another game the rest of the season and settled for third place with a 7-5-2 record.

Offseason

Draft

Personnel

Staff / coaches

Final roster

Preseason

Regular season schedule

Season summary

Week 1

Week 2

Week 3

Week 4

Week 5

Week 6

Week 7

Week 8

Week 9

Week 10

Week 11

Week 12

Week 13

Week 14

Standings

References

External links 
 1973 Cleveland Browns at Pro Football Reference
 1973 Cleveland Browns Statistics at jt-sw.com
 1973 Cleveland Browns Schedule at jt-sw.com
 1973 Cleveland Browns at DatabaseFootball.com  

Cleveland
Cleveland Browns seasons
Cleveland Browns